Jamal Ahmed is a Pakistani politician who had been a Member of the Provincial Assembly of Sindh, from May 2013 to May 2018.

Early life 
He was born on 23 December 1965 in Karachi.

Political career

He was elected to the Provincial Assembly of Sindh as a candidate of Mutahida Quami Movement from Constituency PS-101 KARACHI-XIII in 2013 Pakistani general election.

References

Living people
Sindh MPAs 2013–2018
1965 births
Muttahida Qaumi Movement politicians